Cristóbal Colón was a  unprotected cruiser of the Spanish Navy.

Technical characteristics
Cristóbal Colón was built at La Carraca shipyard, Cadiz, Spain. Her keel was laid in 1883. She had one rather tall funnel. The ship had an iron hull and was rigged as a barque.  The cruiser made  on sea trials, probably the highest speed attained by a cruiser of this class.

Operational history

Cristóbal Colón was sent to the Caribbean and foundered near Pinar del Río, Cuba, on 29 September 1895. A hurricane passing through the area broke up her wreck on 1 October 1895.

References
Chesneau, Roger, and Eugene M. Kolesnik, Eds. Conway's All The World's Fighting Ships 1860-1905. New York, New York: Mayflower Books Inc., 1979. .

External links
 Department of the Navy: Naval Historical Center: Online Library of Selected Images: Spanish Navy Ships: Cristobal Colon (Cruiser, 1887-1895)

Velasco-class cruisers
Ships built in Spain
1887 ships
Maritime incidents in 1895
Shipwrecks in the Caribbean Sea